The 5th Genie Awards were presented on March 21, 1984, at the Royal Alexandra Theatre in Toronto. The awards ceremony was hosted by Louis Del Grande.

Nominations
The nominations were announced on February 9, 1984. Maria Chapdelaine led with 11 nominations overall. However, the nominations were criticized for the fact that three of the five nominees for Best Picture, Maria Chapdelaine, The Terry Fox Story and The Wars, failed to garner Best Director nominations for their directors.

Ceremony
The ceremony was most noted for the participation of Pierre Trudeau, the incumbent Prime Minister of Canada, as presenter of the award for Best Picture. The Globe and Mail film critic Jay Scott criticized his inclusion, writing "Why did he agree to participate in this thing? In the closing moments of his stewardship has he developed an uncontrollable urge to know what it's like to be Ronald Reagan?"

Winners and nominees

References

05
Genie
Genie